Fernando Alexis Canales Alvarado (born April 13, 1995) is a Peruvian footballer who currently plays for Universidad Técnica de Cajamarca.

Club career
Canales participated in 'The Chance', organised by the Nike Academy where he was one of the sixteen 2012 finalists.

He started his professional career with León de Huánuco, before leaving for Alianza Lima in 2014. He spent six months on the sideline in 2016, after tearing ligaments in his knee.

In December 2016, Canales signed for Universidad de San Martín.

International career
Canales played for the Peru under-18 side that competed at the 2013 Bolivarian Games, finishing third. He scored in the semi-final against the Ecuador under-18s. He was later called up for the Peru under-20 side that featured at the 2015 South American Youth Football Championship, playing in 6 games.

Career statistics

Club

Notes

References

1995 births
Living people
Peruvian footballers
Peru under-20 international footballers
Peru youth international footballers
Association football defenders
León de Huánuco footballers
Club Alianza Lima footballers
Club Deportivo Universidad de San Martín de Porres players
Universidad Técnica de Cajamarca footballers
Peruvian Primera División players
People from Camaná Province